Artopoetes is a genus of butterflies in the family Lycaenidae. It is a small east Asian genus of tailless hairstreaks.

Species
 Artopoetes praetextatus (Fujioka, 1992)
 Artopoetes pryeri (Murray, 1873) northeast China, southern Amur, Ussuri, Korea, Japan (Honshu, Hokkaido)

External links

"Artopoetes Chapman, 1909" at Markku Savela's Lepidoptera and Some Other Life Forms

Theclini
Lycaenidae genera
Taxa named by Thomas Algernon Chapman